Sami Mohy El Din Muhammed Al Hajj, aka Sami Al-Haj (Khartoum, Sudan, February 15, 1969) is a Sudanese journalist for the Al Jazeera network. In 2001, while on his way to do camera work for the network in Afghanistan, he was arrested by the Pakistani army and held in the United States Guantanamo Bay detainment camp in Cuba for over six years.  After his release, al-Hajj wrote a book titled Prisoner 345. He was released without charge on May 1, 2008. He later attempted to launch legal action against George W. Bush.

Al Hajj's case was portrayed in a documentary titled Prisoner 345 by Al Jazeera producer Ahmad Ibrahim.

Background
Al Hajj was arrested in Pakistan on December 15, 2001.
He was on his way to work in Afghanistan as a cameraman for Al Jazeera and had a legitimate visa. He was held as an "enemy combatant" at the Guantanamo Bay detainment camp, with Guantanamo Internment Serial Number 345, and was the only journalist to be held in Guantanamo.

British human rights lawyer Clive Stafford Smith represented al-Hajj, and was able to visit him in 2005.  According to Stafford Smith, Al Hajj had "endured horrendous abuse - sexual abuse and religious persecution" and that he had been beaten, leaving a "huge scar" on his face. Stafford Smith also said that Al Hajj had witnessed "the Quran being flushed down the toilet by US soldiers in Afghanistan" and "expletives being written on the Muslim holy book".

On 23 November 2005, Stafford Smith said that, during (125 of 130) interviews, U.S. officials had questioned Al Hajj as to whether Al Jazeera was a front for al-Qaeda.

Stafford Smith stated of his client that:

Al Jazeera responded that Al Hajj reported his passport stolen in Sudan in 1999, and that anything done with the passport after that date was likely the work of identity thieves.

During Al Hajj's time in captivity, Reporters Without Borders repeatedly expressed concern over his detention, mentioning Al Hajj in its annual Worldwide Press Freedom Index, and launched a petition for his release.

In January 2007, Al Hajj and several other inmates went on hunger strike in protest of their treatment in Guantanamo, during which Al Hajj lost over 55 pounds. In response to the hunger strike, Al Hajj and the other inmates were force-fed. Al Hajj's hunger strike lasted 438 days until he was set free on 1 May 2008.

When Alan Johnston, former Gaza Correspondent for the BBC, was abducted on 12 March 2007 in Gaza City by gunmen from the Army of Islam and held for 113 days, Sami Al Hajj made a plea to Johnston's captors to let the journalist go. Following his release, Johnston made a similar plea for the release of Al Hajj, being held by the United States Government in Guantanamo.

Interrogation and treatment

On 20 April 2007, the UK newspaper, The Guardian, started publishing excerpts from Clive Stafford Smith's book, Bad Men: Guantanamo Bay and the Secret Prisons. According to Stafford Smith:

Health and hunger strike
In 1998, Al Hajj was treated for throat cancer and prescribed a course of anti-cancer drugs that he was to take every day for the rest of his life. In letters from the detention camp, he claimed that he was being denied these medications by the authorities.

The authorities were also reported to have "refused to provide him with a support for his knee as this contains metal and is classified as 
a security threat."

On 7 January 2007, Al Hajj went on a hunger strike. Al Jazeera's website published his demands which included:
The right for detainees to practice their religion freely and without duress.
Applying the Geneva Convention to the treatment of Guantanamo detainees.
Releasing a number of prisoners from isolation confinement, and in particular one Shakir Amer that has been in continued isolation since September 2005.
Conducting a full and fair investigation into the deaths of three prisoners who died in June 2006.
His release or trial by a federal US court.

Zachary Katznelson, senior counsel of Reprieve, a London-based human rights group representing Al Hajj, visited the cameraman at Guantanamo Bay on February 1. U.S. military officials declined to confirm whether Al Hajj was among the 12 detainees on hunger strike at the time.

On 22 August 2007, Clive Stafford Smith told Reporters Without Borders that he had found Al Hajj's health had seriously deteriorated since his last visit.
He said that Al Hajj looked more frail, and visibly had trouble concentrating.

On 10 September 2007, Clive Stafford said that Al Hajj was focused on the worry that he would be the next captive to die and losing his ability to speak English.

On 11 September 2007, Al Jazeera reported that Al Hajj was suffering from depression and losing the will to live.

By 19 October 2007, Al Hajj had lost over 55 pounds since beginning his hunger strike in January.

Guantanamo detainee file 

On 26 April 2011, a classified file from Guantanamo on Al Hajj's detention was released by WikiLeaks. The file, dated 4 April 2008, describes Al Hajj as a high risk detainee with "direct ties to Al-Qaida, al-Haramayn non-governmental organization (NGO) and Taleban leadership."

According to the file, Al Hajj "admitted shipping supplies and carrying funds to Chechnya" but had "not been forthcoming regarding his activities in support of terrorist organizations as reported by other sources." The file said that he had been "careful not to implicate himself as a member of an extremist organization, or to have had any dealings with extremists beyond performing interviews as a journalist."

Among the reasons for Al Hajj's transfer to the facility, the file listed:

Reviews by U.S. authorities

Combatant Status Review Tribunal

Stafford Smith summarized the allegations from Al Hajj's Combatant Status Review Tribunal:

According to Al Jazeera, the U.S. authorities labelled Al Hajj an "enemy combatant" and announced a number of charges against him, including:
That he travelled to the middle East, the Balkans, and the Caucasus for clandestine purposes.
That he had an internet site that supports terrorists.
That he was involved in selling Stinger missiles to Chechen rebels.
That he was caught entering Afghanistan illegally.
That he interviewed Osama bin Laden (a charge that was later dropped).

Ahmad Ibrahim, a colleague of Al Hajj who documented his case in the documentary Prisoner 345, denied each these charges.

Subsequent Administrative Review Boards
On 23 February 2007, it was reported that Al Hajj's continued detention had been reviewed by a subsequent Administrative Review Board. Al Hajj was not one of the eighty captives who that round of Administrative Review Boards had recommended for release or transfer.

His colleagues at Al Jazeera said "his detention is American harassment of an Arabic TV network whose coverage has long angered U.S. officials." Lamis Andoni, a Middle East analyst for Al Jazeera, said in reference to the November 2001 and April 2003 bombings of Al Jazeera's offices: "When you are targeted once, it could be a mistake, but when you are bombed twice, it's something else."

The director of the Joint Intelligence Group, Paul Rester, said: "I consider the information that we obtained from him to be useful", though he declined to offer any substantiation for this claim.

During his first Administrative Review Board hearing, Al Hajj said he was going to decline to reply to the charges, on legal advice. However, Al Hajj's lawyer, Clive Stafford Smith, said that:
Al Hajj was not a clandestine financial courier, but: "...he and his wife once carried $220,000 from Qatar to Azerbaijan for his boss at the beverage company - and ... he even declared the cash to customs."
Al Hajj did meet Mamdouh Mahmud Salim once "while working for the beverage company ... when he was sent to pick him up at the airport in Qatar in 1998. During the drive, the two discussed schools and housing."

Release negotiation and release

On 15 August 2007, a spokesperson for the U.S. Department of State stated of Al Hajj's case:

On the same day, Ali Sadiq, an official of the Sudanese Foreign Ministry, stated:

Sami Al Hajj was released on 1 May 2008 from Guantanamo Bay and flown to Sudan. He arrived in the Sudanese capital Khartoum on a US military plane in the early hours of Friday, May 2. Al Jazeera showed footage of him being carried into the hospital on a stretcher, looking frail but smiling and surrounded by well-wishers.

After Guantánamo Bay 
Upon release, al-Hajj announced his intention to sue George W Bush and other leaders involved in his detention at Guantanamo Bay. He co-founded the Guantánamo Justice Centre as part of these efforts. In a later interview, he claimed that the organisation received no external support.

He returned to work for Al Jazeera after his release, leading a new section covering civil liberties and human rights.

Open letter to President Biden

On January 29, 2021, the New York Review of Books published an open letter from al-Hajj, and six other individuals who were formerly held in Guantanamo, to newly inaugurated President Biden, appealing to him to close the detention camp.

See also 
 Hunger strike
 Guantanamo force feeding

References

External links

From Guantánamo to Desk at Al Jazeera, The New York Times, December 22, 2009
Amnesty International case sheet
Aljazeera Guantanamo inmate 'abused', Al Jazeera, June 22, 2005
Aljazeera interview with lawyer Clive Stafford-Smith, Al Jazeera, October 26, 2005
Robert Fisk interview about Sami mp3 download
Sami al-Haj: the banned torture pictures of a journalist in Guantánamo Andy Worthington
An interview with Sami al-Haj, former Guantánamo prisoner and al-Jazeera journalist Andy Worthington
Sami al-Haj: "Torture is terrorism" Andy Worthington

1969 births
Living people
Sudanese extrajudicial prisoners of the United States
Sudanese journalists
Guantanamo detainees known to have been released
Journalists held in extrajudicial detention in the War on Terror
Al Jazeera people
People from Khartoum
American people of Sudanese descent

fr:Liste de détenus de Guantánamo#Sami al-Haj